Alex Insam (born 19 December 1997) is an Italian ski jumper. He competed in two events at the 2018 Winter Olympics.

References

External links
 

1997 births
Living people
Italian male ski jumpers
Olympic ski jumpers of Italy
Ski jumpers at the 2018 Winter Olympics
Sportspeople from Brixen
Ski jumpers  of Fiamme Oro